North Side High School is a secondary school in the Fort Wayne school system, serving the north central neighborhoods of Fort Wayne.

History

Designed by noted architect Charles R. Weatherhogg (1872–1937) and established 1927, North Side High School has been dedicated to giving the best education available. Recently, it has had a massive renovation to accommodate the growing number of students expected to attend in coming years. The North Side High School Gym was home to the Fort Wayne Pistons of the Basketball Association of America (later the National Basketball Association) from 1941 to 1952.

Notable alumni
 Susan E. Mayer, professor and former Dean of the University of Chicago's Harris School of Public Policy
 Dick Hickox, All-American college basketball player (University of Miami)
 Bob Cowan, football player for the Cleveland Browns and Indiana Hoosiers
 Jeanette Reibman, Pennsylvania State Representative and State Senator
 Paul Helmke, former Mayor of Fort Wayne
Zach McKinstry, Professional Baseball player for the Chicago Cubs.

See also
 List of high schools in Indiana
 Summit Athletic Conference
 Fort Wayne, Indiana
Fort Wayne Daisies

References

External links 
 North Side High School

Public high schools in Indiana
Schools in Fort Wayne, Indiana
Educational institutions established in 1927
1927 establishments in Indiana